Novobzhegokay is a rural locality (an aul) in Enemskoye Urban Settlement of Takhtamukaysky District, the Republic of Adygea, Russia. The population was 381 as of 2018. There are 5 streets.

Geography 
The aul located on the right bank of the Afipse River, 16 km west of Takhtamukay (the district's administrative centre) by road. Afipsky is the nearest rural locality.

Ethnicity 
The aul is inhabited by Adyghes.

References 

Rural localities in Takhtamukaysky District